The 1954 Western Illinois Leathernecks football team represented Western Illinois University as a member of the Interstate Intercollegiate Athletic Conference (IIAC) during the 1954 college football season. They were led by first-year head coach Wes Stevens and played their home games at Hanson Field. The Leathernecks finished the season with a 6–1–3 record overall and a 3–1–2 record in conference play, placing third in the IIAC.

Schedule

References

Western Illinois
Western Illinois Leathernecks football seasons
Western Illinois Leathernecks football